Keith Ellis may refer to:

 Keith Ellis (musician) (1946–1978), English bass player
 Keith Ellis (rugby league) (1905–1972), Australian rugby league player
 Keith Ellis (footballer) (born 1935), English footballer
 R. Keith Ellis (born 1949), British theoretical physicist